Falalu Abubakar Dorayi also known as Falalu A. Dorayi (born 4 January 1977) is a Nigerian film director, producer, screenwriter and film actor.

Early life and background
Falalu A Dorayi was born on 4 January 1977 at Dorayi, Gwale, Kano State to Alhaji Abubakar a businessman in Kano. He attended both primary and secondary school in Kano, he obtained diploma in Mass Communication from Bayero University Kano, he acquired professional diploma in Film & Television Production at Maitama Sule University, Kano in 2017. Dorayi also attended film training program at the Asian Academy of Film & Television, Noida in India.

Career
Dorayi began his career in film industry in 1997, with a local drama group when he was in secondary school. After completing his high school studies Dorayi joined Kannywood film industry, the first two film he directed were taken up and claimed by the producer of the film who gave himself the credit of director. He received another directorial opportunities with Sarauniya Films in which he directed film called ‘’Kwangiri”, then followed by ‘’Uwargida’’ and Majalisa.

Dorayi rose to prominence after directing Basaja (2013), in which he featured ensemble cast including Ali Nuhu, Adam A Zango, and Hadiza Aliyu. The film was huge success and was nominated at the 2014 City People Entertainment Awards. In 2015, Dorayi produced ‘’ Gwaska’’ which was directed by Adam A Zango, he also produced ‘’Return of Gwaska’’ (2017).

In 2019, Dorayi directed and starred a TV show named Gidan Badamasi, a comedy which centers around the controversial “Badamasi Family.” The drama revolves around Bamasi’s family that gang up against him when he fails to fulfill his promises.

Filmography
List of films directed by Dorayi.

See also
 List of Nigerian actors
 List of Nigerian film directors
 List of Nigerian film producers

References

External links

1977 births
Living people
Nigerian male film actors
Hausa-language mass media
Male actors in Hausa cinema
21st-century Nigerian male actors
People from Kano State
Kannywood actors
Nigerian male television actors
Nigerian film directors
Nigerian film producers
Nigerian screenwriters